Loutropoli Thermis is a village and a former municipality on the island of Lesbos, North Aegean, Greece. Since the 2019 local government reform it is part of the municipality Mytilene, of which it is a municipal unit. It is located on the central east coast of the island. It has a land area of 79.468 km². Its population was 3,135 at the 2011 census.  Loutrópoli Thermís (pop. 900) was the seat of the municipality that comprises Loutrópoli Thermís, Pigi, Komi, Mistegna and Nees Kydonies.  The largest towns are Loutrópoli Thermís, Mistegná (407), Nées Kydoníes (485), and Pigí (350).

History

The region of Thermi has a history going back five thousand years. The region takes its name from the thermal springs located there for centuries. Archaeological finds indicate that during the antiquity, the Greek goddess Artemis was worshipped as protector of the curative springs.

After archaeological excavations in the past years next to the beach, the layers and traces of five cities built one over the other were revealed, the oldest of which dates back to the middle of the 3rd millennium. 
The magnificence and the radiance of the religious and therapeutic centre of Thermi is also testified by numerous archaeological finds, including the foundations of buildings and inscriptions. Some of these relics are exhibited at the outdoor archaeological site of Horafa. At the beginning of the 20th century, the region of Thermi was popular for its luxurious hotel, Sarlitza Palace, which was built on the plans of French architects. For about thirty years, it received great recognition, attracting visitors and celebrities from all over the world.  Today it is in decline and only the hot baths are operational.

References

Populated places in Lesbos
Spa towns in Greece